Under Fire is an album by Argentinian jazz composer and saxophonist Gato Barbieri featuring performances recorded in New York in 1971 and first released on the Flying Dutchman label in 1973.

Reception

AllMusic awarded the album 3 stars stating "Under Fire is Gato Barbieri in his early-'70s prime, when the Argentinean tenorman's transition from the avant-garde to exploring his South American continental routes still hadn't passed beyond the pale into flaccid fusion".

Track listing
 "El Parana" (Gato Barbieri) – 8:58
 " Yo le Canto a la Luna" (Atahualpa Yupanqui) – 4:49
 "Antonico" (Ismael Silva) – 3:48 	
 "Maria Domingas" (Jorge Ben) – 9:28
 "El Sertao" (Gato Barbieri, Sérgio Ricardo) – 8:16

Personnel
Gato Barbieri – tenor saxophone, vocals
Lonnie Liston Smith – piano, electric piano
John Abercrombie – guitar, electric guitar
Stanley Clarke – bass  
Roy Haynes – drums
James Mtume – congas
Airto Moreira – percussion, drums
Moulay Ali Hafid – percussion

References

1973 albums
Albums produced by Bob Thiele
Flying Dutchman Records albums
Gato Barbieri albums